The 2008 election for North Dakota's at-large congressional district took place on November 4, 2008.  The incumbent, Democratic-NPL Congressman Earl Pomeroy, was re-elected to his ninth term. Republican Duane Sand formally announced that he was running on March 20, 2008. He previously challenged Pomeroy in 2004. 

Initial speculation for a Republican challenger included Governor of North Dakota John Hoeven and Attorney General Wayne Stenehjem, who were enjoying very high approval ratings throughout their terms of office. State Representative Kim Koppelman and State House Majority Leader Rick Berg ruled themselves out of the running on February 20, 2008, Another possible challenger was Brian Kalk, who decided to run for Public Service Commissioner and was successful in the November election.

, this is the last time that the Democratic-NPL has won North Dakota's House seat.

Results

References

External links
Elections and Voting from the North Dakota Secretary of State
Race ranking and details from CQ Politics
North Dakota House race from 2008 Race Tracker
Campaign contributions from OpenSecrets
North Dakota At-Large from OurCampaigns.org
U.S. Congress candidates for North Dakota at Project Vote Smart
Official campaign websites
Earl Pomeroy, Democratic-NPL Incumbent
Duane Sand, Republican 

North Dakota
2008
United States House of Representatives